Joseph L. Garrubbo (born January 28, 1938) is an American Democratic Party politician who served in the New Jersey General Assembly from 1974 to 1976, and as a Judge.  He is a 1962 graduate of Seton Hall University Law School and is a Certified Civil Trial Attorney.  He served as a Union County Freeholder and as a Municipal Court Judge.  He was elected to the State Assembly in 1973, defeating freshman Republican Assemblyman C. Louis Bassano by 6,153 votes.  He lost his bid for re-election to a second term in 1975, losing to Bassano by 1,156 votes.  He is a partner at Garrubbo & Capece.

References

Seton Hall University School of Law alumni
1938 births
Living people